Oscar Louis Coggins (born October 7, 1999) is a triathlon athlete from Hong Kong, raised by British parents. 

Coggins attended Millfield School from 2016 to 2018. In 2018, he renounced his British citizenship in order to represent this birth place Hong Kong in the Olympics and other games. He represented Hong Kong at the 2020 Olympics, following in Daniel Lee's footsteps as the second male triathlete representing the region at the Olympic Games and placed the highest of any Hong Kong triathlete. He finished a 33rd in the men's triathlon at Tokyo 2020.

References

External Links
 Official Website of Oscar Coggins

Hong Kong male triathletes
Olympic triathletes of Hong Kong
1999 births
Living people
Triathletes at the 2020 Summer Olympics
People educated at Millfield